Margaret Alexis Fitzsimmons-Smith (June 8, 1921 – June 9, 1993) was a Canadian-born American actress and singer. She appeared in several major Hollywood films in the 1940s and had a notable career on Broadway in the 1970s, winning a Tony Award in 1972 for the Stephen Sondheim-James Goldman musical Follies.

Early life

Smith was born in Penticton, British Columbia, to Gladys Mabel Fitz-Simmons (a Canadian) and Alexander Smith (a Scot). Her family moved to Los Angeles when she was about a year old. Her parents both became naturalized U.S. citizens in 1939, through which she derived her United States citizenship.

Smith grew up in Los Angeles, attending Hollywood High School along with other future talents, including actress Nanette Fabray. Smith made her professional debut performing ballet at the Hollywood Bowl. She was discovered in 1940 at Los Angeles City College, acting in a school production, by a Warner Brothers' talent scout.

Warner Bros

Early roles
After being discovered by a talent scout while attending college, Smith was signed to a contract by Warner Bros. Her early film roles were uncredited bit parts in films like Lady with Red Hair (1940), She Couldn't Say No (1940), Flight from Destiny (1941), The Great Mr. Nobody (1941), Here Comes Happiness (1941), Affectionately Yours (1941), Singapore Woman (1941), Passage from Hong Kong (1941) and Three Sons o' Guns (1941).

Her first credited role was in the feature film Dive Bomber (1941), playing the female lead opposite Errol Flynn. It was a "decorative" part but the film was very successful. Warners decided to build her up as a star.

She had a support role in The Smiling Ghost (1941) and appeared with her future husband Craig Stevens in Steel Against the Sky (1941), the first time she was top billed.

Stardom
Smith co starred opposite Errol Flynn in Gentleman Jim (1942), one of the most popular movies of the year. Her lead appearance in The Constant Nymph (1943) was well-received and led to bigger parts.

After a cameo in Thank Your Lucky Stars (1943) Smith appeared opposite Fredric March in The Adventures of Mark Twain (1944), and starred alongside Ann Sheridan in The Doughgirls (1944). She had another cameo in Hollywood Canteen (1944) then co starred with Jack Benny in The Horn Blows at Midnight (1945).

Smith co-starred with Humphrey Bogart in Conflict (1945) and Robert Alda in the George Gershwin biopic Rhapsody In Blue (1945). She liked her part in the latter because "while a heavy of sorts I get to do the unexpected."

She was reunited with Flynn in San Antonio (1945) in which she sang a special version of the popular ballad "Some Sunday Morning"; the movie was a huge hit.

Smith appeared with Sheridan again in One More Tomorrow (1946) then Cary Grant in a sanitized, fictionalized version of the life of Cole and Linda Porter in Night and Day (1946); the latter was another box office success.

Smith appeared alongside Eleanor Parker and Paul Henreid in Of Human Bondage (1946), then did a second film with Bogart, The Two Mrs. Carrolls (1947); Hopper described the latter as "a typical Alexis Smith role". She later said of her Warners years "more often than not I played the other woman."

Smith made Stallion Road (1948) with Ronald Reagan and The Woman in White (1948) with Parker. She was top billed in The Decision of Christopher Blake (1948) which was announced as an attempt to change her image instead of being just "a mirror to reflect others' emotions".

She co starred with Dane Clark in Whiplash (1948), was Joel McCrea's leading lady in South of St. Louis (1949) then worked with Zachary Scott in One Last Fling (1949). MGM borrowed her for a Clark Gable film Any Number Can Play (1950) then she made one last movie with Flynn, Montana (1950).

In October 1949 Smith was granted a release from her contract with Warner Bros after refusing being loaned out to Universal for a role in Shoplifter (1950) (she was replaced by Andrea King). She had been at the studio for nine years, having signed a four-year deal in 1946 that had the option of going to 1953.

After Warners
Smith went to Universal to appear in Wyoming Mail (1950), a Western with Stephen McNally, and Undercover Girl (1950) a film noir. She played Jane Wyman's rival in Paramount's Here Comes the Groom (1951), her favorite role. At Universal she made Cave of Outlaws (1951) with MacDonald Carey then back at Paramount was in The Turning Point (1952) with William Holden.

She received excellent reviews for playing Private Lives on stage with Victor Jory.

Smith was in Split Second (1953) at RKO with McNally then went to England to star in The Sleeping Tiger (1954) with Dirk Bogarde for Joseph Losey.

In 1953 she appeared on stage in Bell Book and Candle with Victor Jory.

She began appearing in television on shows such as The Star and the Story, Stage 7, The 20th Century-Fox Hour, The Joseph Cotten Show: On Trial, Robert Montgomery Presents, Lux Video Theatre, Schlitz Playhouse, and The United States Steel Hour.

At Republic she made The Eternal Sea (1955) with Sterling Hayden. She had no offers so signed to go on tour with her husband in a production of Plain and Fancy which meant she missed out on roles in the films Serenade and The Toy Tiger.

Smith was in Beau James (1957) with Bob Hope, This Happy Feeling (1958) with Curt Jurgens and  The Young Philadelphians  with Paul Newman (1959).

She also appeared on a Dean Martin and Jerry Lewis radio (NBC) broadcast on January 25, 1952.

Stage career
While Smith was under contract at Warner Bros., she met fellow actor Craig Stevens; they wed in 1944. In her later years, Smith toured in several stage hits including the 1955 National company of Plain and Fancy, Jean Kerr's Mary, Mary, Any Wednesday and Cactus Flower, all co-starring her husband.

In the 1960s Smith continued to work on television with roles in Adventures in Paradise, Michael Shayne, The Defenders, The Governor & J.J., and Marcus Welby, M.D..

Smith appeared on the cover of the May 3, 1971 issue of Time as the result of the critical acclaim for her singing and dancing role in Hal Prince's Broadway production of Stephen Sondheim's Follies, which marked her long-awaited Broadway debut. In 1972, she won the Tony Award for Best Actress in a Musical for her performance.

Her stage career continued through the 1970s, with appearances in the 1973 all-star revival of The Women (1973), the short-lived re-working of William Inge's drama Picnic, re-titled Summer Brave (1975), and the ill-fated musical Platinum (1978), which earned Smith another Tony nomination for her performance but closed after a brief run.

She starred in several regional productions of Applause and then toured for more than a year as the madam in The Best Little Whorehouse in Texas, including a seven-month run in Los Angeles.

She continued to appear on TV in movies like Nightside and shows such as The Lives of Benjamin Franklin. She also performed in nightclubs.

Later work
Smith returned to the big screen with star billing at the age of 54 in Jacqueline Susann's Once Is Not Enough (1975) opposite Kirk Douglas, followed by The Little Girl Who Lives Down the Lane with Martin Sheen and Jodie Foster the following year and Casey's Shadow with Walter Matthau in 1978. She and her husband appeared in Losey's The Trout (1982) and she had roles in A Death in California, Dress Gray, and The Love Boat.

One of her later film roles came in 1986, again with Douglas when he reunited with frequent co-star Burt Lancaster for the comedy Tough Guys. Smith had a recurring role on the television series Dallas as Clayton Farlow's mentally unstable sister,  Lady Jessica Montford in 1984, and again in 1990.

She also starred in the short-lived 1988 series Hothouse, and was nominated for an Emmy Award for her guest appearance on Cheers in 1990.

Her last film role was in The Age of Innocence (1993).

Death
Alexis Smith died of brain cancer in Los Angeles on June 9, 1993, the day after her 72nd birthday. She had no children; her sole survivor was her husband of 49 years, actor Craig Stevens. Smith's final film, The Age of Innocence (1993), was released shortly after her death. Her body was cremated and her ashes were scattered over the Pacific Ocean.

Filmography

Stage work
Private Lives (1952)
Bell, Book and Candle (1953)
Plain and Fancy (1955 National Tour)
Wonderful Town (1957)
Mary, Mary (1965)
Cactus Flower (1968 National Tour)
Follies (1971)
The Women (1973)
Applause (1973)
Summer Brave (1975)
Platinum (1978)
The Best Little Whorehouse in Texas (1979–80 National Tour)
Pal Joey (1983)
Nymph Errant (1989 Concert)

Radio appearances

See also

References

Notes

Bibliography

 Bubbeo, Daniel. The Women of Warner Brothers. McFarland, 2001. .
 Cozad, W. Lee. More Magnificent Mountain Movies: The Silver Screen Years 1940–2004. Lake Arrowhead, California: Sunstroke Media, 2006. .
 Donnelley, Paul. Fade to Black: A Book of Movie Obituaries. London: Omnibus Press, 2005. .
 Kirby, Walter. "Better Radio Programs for the Week". The Decatur Daily Review, November 16, 1952. Retrieved: June 18, 2015 via Newspapers.com .
 Maltin, Leonard. "Alexis Smith". Leonard Maltin's Movie Encyclopedia. New York: Dutton, 1994. .
 Monush, Barry. Screen World Presents the Encyclopedia of Hollywood Film Actors: From the silent era to 1965. Applause Theatre & Cinema Books, 2003. .
 "Film and legit actress Alexis Smith dead at 72". Variety, June 10, 1993. Retrieved: March 11, 2009.

External links

 
 
 
 

1921 births
1993 deaths
20th-century American actresses
20th-century American singers
20th-century American women singers
20th-century Canadian actresses
20th-century Canadian women singers
Actresses from British Columbia
Canadian emigrants to the United States
Canadian film actresses
Canadian musical theatre actresses
Canadian people of Scottish descent
Canadian stage actresses
Canadian television actresses
Deaths from brain cancer in the United States
People from Penticton
Tony Award winners
Warner Bros. contract players